Lander Van Steenbrugghe (born 27 November 1986 in Oudenaarde) is a Belgian footballer, who is currently playing for KVVV Ardennen in the Belgian Provincial leagues.

Career
At Zulte Waregem, Van Steenbrugghe played 35 matches at the highest level of Belgian football between 2005 and 2008, winning also the 2005–06 Belgian Cup. The season thereafter he also played three matches in the 2006–07 UEFA Cup. Zulte Waregem sent Van Steenbrugghe out on loan to Belgian Second Division team OH Leuven for the 2008-09 season, a loan which was extended by another season until the summer of 2010. Thereafter, he moved to Roeselare, before signing with Oostende in November 2011. In the summer of 2013, after just being promoted with Oostende to the Belgian Pro League, Van Steenbrugghe moved to Eendracht Aalst.

References

External links
 

1986 births
Living people
Belgian footballers
S.V. Zulte Waregem players
K.S.V. Roeselare players
Oud-Heverlee Leuven players
K.V. Oostende players
S.C. Eendracht Aalst players
Belgian Pro League players
Challenger Pro League players
Association football midfielders
People from Oudenaarde
Footballers from East Flanders